Rob Schnapf is an American record producer and musician.  He was the co-producer (along with Tom Rothrock) of Elliott Smith's albums Either/Or,  XO (on which he also played guitar on the song "Baby Britain"), Figure 8 and From a Basement on the Hill, for which he was recruited by Smith's family to complete after Smith's death.

Schnapf runs the Mant Sounds studio.

Background 
Schnapf, along with Rothrock and partner Bradshaw Lambert, started Bong Load Custom Records in the early 1990s which is notable for releasing Beck's "Loser" single. Schnapf first heard Beck as he was playing on the street during the annual Sunset Junction Fair. A week later Rothrock saw Beck jump onstage to play in between bands during a show at Jabberjaw and approached him afterwards about recording his songs. Together Rothrock, Schnapf, Beck and Karl Stephenson recorded the bulk of what would become "Loser", and subsequently Mellow Gold, Beck's first major label album. Rothrock and Schnapf would continue to record with Beck working on material for what was intended to be his follow-up to Mellow Gold, a somber acoustic affair meant to silence detractors that claimed he was a one hit wonder joke act. Beck eventually had a change of heart and went on to record Odelay with The Dust Brothers only using one song from the Rothrock/Schnapf sessions, "Ramshackle", as the album closer.

Rob and Tom produced the 1993 Dog Society album entitled Test Your Own Eyes.
Schnapf later produced Guided By Voices' second of two TVT Records releases; Isolation Drills in 2001 and The Vines debut album Highly Evolved in 2002.
In 2003, he produced Saves The Day's album, In Reverie.
Also, in 2005, he produced Nine Black Alps' debut album Everything Is.

Schnapf has also worked in conjunction with Australian band Powderfinger in the production of their sixth studio album Dream Days at the Hotel Existence.

Schnapf produced Brooklyn based artist Kevin Devine's major label debut Put Your Ghost to Rest.  Following the success of the partnership Schnapf was also recruited to produce Devine's "Another Bag of Bones" a single released prior to Devine's follow up album.

This was followed by work with The Whigs on their debut Mission Control for ATO Records.

Schnapf worked with Australian rock band Kisschasy on their third studio album, Seizures and Wild Light's debut for Startime International Records.

Schnapf then worked with Booker T. Jones on his Grammy winning Potato Hole album featuring the Drive By Truckers and Neil Young.  He also worked with Dr. Dog and Toadies 2010 release of Feeler.

Schnapf produced Canadian indie-rock band Tokyo Police Club's 2010 second album Champ.

Schnapf is also credited with the creation of the tambourine back beat, and the 3 against 2 vibraslap.

He is currently in development of a 1-hour crime drama called the Pope and The Monkey.

Production discography
1993: Test Your Own Eyes – Dog Society (Co-producer w/ Tom Rothrock)
1994: Mellow Gold – Beck (Co-producer)
1995: Daredevil – Fu Manchu (Co-producer w/ Tom Rothrock and Fu Manchu)
1996: Mic City Sons - Heatmiser (Co-producer w/ Tom Rothrock and Heatmiser)
1997: Either/Or – Elliott Smith (Co-producer w/ Tom Rothrock)
1998: XO – Elliott Smith (Co-producer w/ Tom Rothrock)
1999: Mock Tudor – Richard Thompson (Co-producer w/ Tom Rothrock)
2000: Figure 8 – Elliott Smith (Co-producer w/ Tom Rothrock)
2001: Isolation Drills – Guided by Voices
2001: Stay What You Are – Saves the Day
2002: Your Majesty – The Anniversary
2002: Highly Evolved – The Vines
2003: In Reverie – Saves the Day
2003: La Musica Negra – Verbena
2004: From a Basement on the Hill – Elliott Smith 
2004: Winning Days – The Vines 
2006: Put Your Ghost To Rest – Kevin Devine
2007: Dream Days at the Hotel Existence – Powderfinger
2007: Scream And Light Up The Sky – The Honorary Title
2007: Heart Tuned To D.E.A.D. – Switches
2008: Mission Control – The Whigs
2008: Melodia – The Vines
2009: Adult Nights – Wild Light
2009: Potato Hole – Booker T. Jones (Co-producer)
2009: Seizures – Kisschasy
2010: Champ – Tokyo Police Club
2010: Sweet Thing – Sweet Thing
2010: Shame, Shame – Dr. Dog
2012: Emerge – Dog Society
2012: "A Sleep & a Forgetting" – Islands
2013: Bulldozer – Kevin Devine
2013: FIDLAR – FIDLAR
2014: Night Moves – H-burns
2015: St. Catherine – Ducktails
2016: Cody – Joyce Manor
2016: Cold Coffee – Barrie-James O'Neill
2017: Lemon Cotton Candy Sunset – Richard Edwards
2018: Heaven – Dilly Dally
2018: Marlin Fisher – Henry Chadwick
2020: Alphabetland – X
2020: "Underground Forever"/"Hustlin" - Jonathan Tyler2022: Canary Yellow – Soft Kill
2022: (watch my moves)'' – Kurt Vile (Co-producer)

References

External links
- Retrospective documentary done for the anniversary of Beck's first album, features interviews with Schnapf

American record producers
Year of birth missing (living people)
Living people